Kieth is the given name or surname of:

 Kieth Engen (1925–2004), American operatic bass
 Kieth Hymmen (1913–1978), Canadian politician
 Kieth Merrill (born 1940), American film writer, director and producer
 Kieth O'dor (1962–1995), British racing driver
 Sam Kieth (born 1963), American comics writer and illustrator and film director

See also
 Keith (given name)
 Keith (surname)

English-language masculine given names